Anthony Samuel Selby (26 February 1938 – 5 September 2021) was an English actor. He was best known for his roles as Clive Mitchell in EastEnders, Corporal Percy Marsh in Get Some In!, and Sabalom Glitz in Doctor Who.

Life and career
Selby was born in Lambeth, London, in February 1938, the son of Annie Elizabeth (Weaver), a waitress, and Samuel Joseph Selby, a cab driver. After training at the Italia Conti Stage School, he made his adult stage debut in 1956. His theatre work included the original production of Edward Bond's controversial play Saved at the Royal Court Theatre in 1965. He has appeared in many television programmes including a starring role in RAF National Service comedy Get Some In!, and a recurring role in the BBC science fiction television series Doctor Who as the intergalactic conman Sabalom Glitz.

In 1965, he appeared as a convict under sentence of death in the BBC television drama Three Clear Sundays, directed by Ken Loach.

He had one of his earliest film acting roles in The Early Bird (1965),  Alfie (1966), starring Michael Caine, and his other film appearances include Press for Time (1966), Poor Cow (1967), Witchfinder General (1968), Before Winter Comes (1969), In Search of Gregory (1969), Villain (1971), Nobody Ordered Love (1972), and Adolf Hitler: My Part in his Downfall (1973). In 1971-2 he played magician's assistant Sam Maxstead in children's supernatural TV series Ace of Wands and had a brief 1972 appearance as a jealous fiancé in Public Eye.

Selby starred in the episode "Queen's Pawn" in the hard-hitting police drama The Sweeney. He played armed robber John Lyon, a flash "celebrity criminal" consumed with his own self publicity.

Other notable television appearances in the 1970s included Callan, The Avengers as a villainous car mechanic, Bless This House as a depressed burglar, and as Boozy in the all-star Eric Sykes comedy If You Go Down in the Woods Today (1981). He appeared in three episodes of the drama series Minder, twice playing Jack, the minder of gangster's wife Rose Mellors. In the early 1990s he played chauffeur to Adam Faith's character in the drama series Love Hurts; he also played Clive Mitchell in BBC's soap opera EastEnders in 2002.

Selby appeared in the third episode of The Good Life (known as Good Neighbors in the US), as a rag-and-bone man who sold the Goods an old wood stove and brought them a cat.

In the United States, Selby had an uncredited role as a hood in the first Superman motion picture.

Selby played Susan Harper's long-lost father Arthur in the BBC comedy My Family, in the episode "A Decent Proposal", first broadcast on 12 August 2011.

In 2012, he appeared in the film Cockneys vs Zombies.

He appeared in the television series New Tricks as Danny Paye, an East End loan shark, in the 2009 episode Meat is Murder.

Selby died in London on 5 September 2021, at the age of 83, after contracting COVID-19.

Selected filmography

References

External links
 
 

1938 births
2021 deaths
20th-century English male actors
21st-century English male actors
Deaths from the COVID-19 pandemic in England
English male soap opera actors
Male actors from London
People from Lambeth